KUUU (92.5 FM, "92.5 The Beat") is a radio station licensed to South Jordan, Utah, serving the Salt Lake City metropolitan area. Owned by Broadway Media, the station primarily broadcasts a Rhythmic adult contemporary format during the daytime hours, but transitions to a rhythmic contemporary-based playlist during the evening and overnight hours. The station's studios are located in Downtown Salt Lake City and its transmitter site is located southwest of the city on Farnsworth Peak in the Oquirrh Mountains.

KUUU broadcasts in HD Radio, carrying simulcasts of sister stations KYMV and KEGA on its HD2 and HD3 subchannels. In turn, KUUU is simulcast on the HD3 subchannel of sister station KUDD.

History
The station was launched on September 1, 1979, and adopted its callsign KTLE on September 10. On May 19, 1982, it was modified to KTLE-FM. On May 9, 1997, it was slightly changed to KTKL. 

The station previously carried a "nostalgia" format;  on February 27, 1999, the station flipped to rhythmic contemporary as U92, and applied for the call letters KUUU to match the new branding. The launch of U92 returned the rhythmic contemporary format to the Salt Lake City market for the first time since KZHT's 1997 flip to hot adult contemporary. The station was originally licensed to Tooele, Utah, and relied on a translator on 92.3 to cover Provo, Utah. In February 2005, the station relocated from 92.1 FM to 92.5 FM, and changed its city of license to South Jordan, allowing it to better cover the Salt Lake Valley.

In contrast to the conservatism of the market (due to it being the base of the LDS Church), KUUU frequently ranked among Salt Lake City's highest-rated radio stations among listeners 18–34. This demographic is especially prominent in Utah due to it having the youngest median age among all U.S. states. KUUU also gained a reputation for helping to break singles from artists such as Flo Rida, Plies, and T-Pain. In 2008, program director Brian Michel credited not being owned by a larger conglomerate as giving KUUU flexibility in serving its audience, commenting that "people in San Antonio aren't telling us what to play. We have no outside consultants." In February 2008, it was reported that a reality show following the station's staff was being pitched.

On June 18, 2010, KUUU, along with KUDD and KYLZ, were sold to Simmons Media Group, who in turn sold the stations to Broadway Media in 2013.

The station promoted hip-hop concert events such as the "U92 Summer Jam". In February 2019, KUUU held the "20th Anniversary Throwback Jam" concert at Vivint Arena to celebrate the 20th anniversary of U92, headlined by Ice Cube.

92.5 The Beat
By June 2022, KUUU's ratings had fallen to a 0.8 share, tied for 24th place in the Salt Lake City market. In an effort to improve ratings, Broadway Media hired Matt 'Mateo' Walling as Program Director. The station had also pivoted to predominantly carrying classic hip-hop music between 6:00 a.m. and 7:00 p.m. daily, relegating current and recurrent music to the evening and overnight hours. On August 5, 2022, at 5 p.m., KUUU began stunting with a loop of "Jiggle Jiggle" by Duke & Jones and Louis Theroux, interspersed with bumpers promoting a "goodbye to U, but not 92" on August 8 at 3:00 p.m., and a 92-cent gasoline giveaway whose location would be revealed at that time, in addition to self-deprecating jokes about the station's low ratings. At the promised time, KUUU rebranded as 92.5 The Beat Utah's #1 For Throwbacks to emphasize the new positioning.

By January 2023, KUUU shifted to rhythmic adult contemporary (as shown with its playlist and its new positioner, ("The Rhythm of Salt Lake") and eventually, The Beat of Salt Lake. The station would still continue to play current Rhythmic hits in the evening/nighttime.

References

External links

Classic hip hop radio stations in the United States
Rhythmic contemporary radio stations in the United States
UUU
Mass media in Salt Lake City
Radio stations established in 1992